Cuthbert (Chip) Hamilton Ellis FRSA (29 June 1909 – 29 June 1987) was an English railway writer and painter. He was an Associate of the Institution of Locomotive Engineers and a Fellow of the Royal Society of Arts

He attended Westminster school and is reported to have briefly been at Oxford. He published the first of his 36 books, mostly on railway subjects, at the age of 21.

During 1940 Ellis was sent to Switzerland by MI6 under the guise of reporting for Modern Transport to organise saboteurs, but is reported not to have made contact with his handlers.

Ellis covered a broad range of railway subjects in his books, the best-known of which is The Trains we Loved (Allen & Unwin, 1947). His obituarist in The Times commented that his Railway Carriages in the British Isles from 1830 to 1914 (1965, revised from an earlier book) "despite its near-obsession with matters lavatorial and ablutory ... was an epoch-making work". As a knowledgeable railwayman he appeared in the 1968 TV documentary 4472: Flying Scotsman and appeared twice in the BBC TV game show Animal, Vegetable, Mineral? in railway themed episodes.

He also wrote a small number of novels, such as The Engineer-Corporal (1940) and Dandy Hart (1947). Both of which were fictional, somewhat "voluble [and] long winded", and deeply based on an interest in railway operations, which was also assumed in the reader.

He had an interest in model railways: his 1962 book Model Railways 1838-1939 was said by The Times to have "led the way in charting the early history of this ... hobby". He was an early member and for some time Vice-President of the Historical Model Railway Society.

His 1959 humorous book Rapidly Round the Bend was described as "[doing] for railways what Sellers and Yeatman had done for general history" (a reference to the authors of 1066 and All That).

He has paintings in the National Railway Museum, the Royal Logistic Corps Museum and the Museum of Island Railway History on the Isle of Wight. The National Portrait Gallery holds two photographs of him, both taken in the 1960s.

Publications

References

External links

 (Substantial compilation of sourced information about Ellis including an obituary from Railway World, and details and reviews of his books)

1909 births
1987 deaths
English artists
Rail transport writers
Railway historians
20th-century English historians